John Burnett (1935 – 29 December 2022) was an English professional rugby league footballer who played in the 1950s and 1960s.

Background
John Burnett was born in Halifax, West Riding of Yorkshire, England, he was a pupil at Battinson Road School (now Mount Pellon Primary Academy), Halifax, and he was the chairman of The Shay Redevelopment Appeal committee that had the task of raising £140,000 towards the cost of the first stage redevelopment .

Playing career

County honours
John Burnett won caps for Yorkshire while at Halifax.

Championship final appearances
John Burnett played, and was captain, in Halifax's 15-7 victory over St. Helens in the Championship Final during the 1964–65 season at Station Road, Swinton on Saturday 22 May 1965.

Club career
John Burnett made his début for Halifax on Saturday 16 January 1954, and he played his last match for Halifax on Saturday 15 April 1967.

Honoured at Halifax RLFC
John Burnett was a Halifax RLFC Hall of Fame inductee.

Death
Burnett died on 27 December 2022, at the age of 87.

References

External links
Search for "Burnett" at rugbyleagueproject.org
Dramatic story of old Halifax
Rugby League: Halifax farewell to Thrum Hall

1935 births
2022 deaths
English rugby league players
Halifax R.L.F.C. captains
Halifax R.L.F.C. players
Rugby league centres
Rugby league players from Halifax, West Yorkshire
Yorkshire rugby league team players